New 7 Wonders Cities (2011–2014) was the third in a series of Internet-based polls operated by the New 7 Wonders Foundation. It followed New7Wonders of the World and New7Wonders of Nature.

The poll began in 2007 with more than 1200 nominees from 220 countries.  A longlist of 77, limited to a maximum of one city per country, was considered by a panel headed by Federico Mayor Zaragoza, former director-general of UNESCO, which shortlisted 28 suggestions. The shortlist was then opened to a public vote. Announced in 2011, it ended in 2014 with the selection of Beirut, Doha, Durban, Havana, Kuala Lumpur, La Paz and Vigan as the winning cities.

Winners

References

External links
New7Wonders official website
New7Wonders Cities
Bernard Weber Project Founder
 
Cultural lists
Internet properties disestablished in 2014
Internet properties established in 2011